This is a list of films by year produced in the country of South Korea which came into existence officially in September 1948. The lists of Korean films are divided by period for political reasons. For earlier films of united Korea see List of Korean films of 1919–1948. For the films of North Korea (September 1948 to present) see List of North Korean films. For an A-Z list of films see :Category:Korean films.

1948-1959
List of South Korean films of 1948–1959
 List of South Korean films of 1948
 List of South Korean films of 1949
 List of South Korean films of 1950
 List of South Korean films of 1951
 List of South Korean films of 1952
 List of South Korean films of 1953
 List of South Korean films of 1954
 List of South Korean films of 1955
 List of South Korean films of 1956
 List of South Korean films of 1957
 List of South Korean films of 1958
 List of South Korean films of 1959

1960s
List of South Korean films of 1960
List of South Korean films of 1961
List of South Korean films of 1962
List of South Korean films of 1963
List of South Korean films of 1964
List of South Korean films of 1965
List of South Korean films of 1966
List of South Korean films of 1967
List of South Korean films of 1968
List of South Korean films of 1969

1970s
List of South Korean films of 1970
List of South Korean films of 1971
List of South Korean films of 1972
List of South Korean films of 1973
List of South Korean films of 1974
List of South Korean films of 1975
List of South Korean films of 1976
List of South Korean films of 1977
List of South Korean films of 1978
List of South Korean films of 1979

1980s
List of South Korean films of 1980
List of South Korean films of 1981
List of South Korean films of 1982
List of South Korean films of 1983
List of South Korean films of 1984
List of South Korean films of 1985
List of South Korean films of 1986
List of South Korean films of 1987
List of South Korean films of 1988
List of South Korean films of 1989

1990s
List of South Korean films of 1990
List of South Korean films of 1991
List of South Korean films of 1992
List of South Korean films of 1993
List of South Korean films of 1994
List of South Korean films of 1995
List of South Korean films of 1996
List of South Korean films of 1997
List of South Korean films of 1998
List of South Korean films of 1999

2000s
List of South Korean films of 2000
List of South Korean films of 2001
List of South Korean films of 2002
List of South Korean films of 2003
List of South Korean films of 2004
List of South Korean films of 2005
List of South Korean films of 2006
List of South Korean films of 2007
List of South Korean films of 2008
List of South Korean films of 2009

2010s
List of South Korean films of 2010
List of South Korean films of 2011
List of South Korean films of 2012
List of South Korean films of 2013
List of South Korean films of 2014
List of South Korean films of 2015
List of South Korean films of 2016
List of South Korean films of 2017
List of South Korean films of 2018
List of South Korean films of 2019

2020s
List of South Korean films of 2020
List of South Korean films of 2021
List of South Korean films of 2022
List of South Korean films of 2023

Sources 
 
 
 South Korean film at the Internet Movie Database
 Korean Movie Database